Atlee Pomerene (December 6, 1863November 12, 1937) was an American Democratic Party politician from Ohio. He represented Ohio in the United States Senate from 1911 until 1923.

Biography

Pomerene was born on December 6, 1863, in Berlin, Holmes County, Ohio, and his spouse was Mary Bockrus Pomerene. He studied at Princeton University and the University of Cincinnati Law School.

Career
He began practicing law in Canton, Ohio, in 1886. After serving in a variety of city, county, and state positions as solicitor and prosecutor, Pomerene was elected the 31st lieutenant governor of Ohio in 1910. He briefly served in the post in early 1911 before being elected by the State Legislature to the U.S. Senate. Pomerene was re-elected in 1916, but narrowly lost a bid for a third term six years later. Pomerene was appointed by President Calvin Coolidge to serve as a special prosecutor to deal with the Teapot Dome scandal. He ran unsuccessfully for the other U.S. Senate seat from Ohio in 1926 and for the Democratic nomination to the U.S. presidency in 1928. In 1932, President Herbert Hoover appointed Pomerene to succeed Charles G. Dawes as head of the Reconstruction Finance Corporation after Dawes' sudden resignation on June 7.

Death
Pomerene died in Cleveland on November 12, 1937, and was buried in Westlawn Cemetery, Canton, Stark County, Ohio US.

References

External links

1863 births
1937 deaths
People from Berlin, Holmes County, Ohio
Democratic Party United States senators from Ohio
Ohio Democrats
Lieutenant Governors of Ohio
Reconstruction Finance Corporation
Special prosecutors
People from Canton, Ohio
Princeton University alumni
University of Cincinnati College of Law alumni
Burials at West Lawn Cemetery
20th-century American politicians